Vanessa Demouy (born 5 April 1973) is an actress and model.  She began modeling at age seventeen and later crossed over into film and television.

She is primarily known for her role as Linda in a French sitcom Models in Paradise (Coeurs caraïbes). She was also the third model for Lara Croft coming after Rhona Mitra and before Nell McAndrew.

Filmography 
 2017 : Chacun sa vie et son intime conviction

References

External links
 

1973 births
Living people
People from Moulins, Allier
French female models